Mukul Kumar is an Indian civil servant and writer. He works for the Indian Railway Traffic Service in New Delhi.

His published works include three novels, As Boys Become Men, Seduction By Truth, Aarzoo-Arshan,  and three poetry collections, The Irrepressible Echos,Catharsis. and The joy of melancholy.

References

21st-century Indian poets
21st-century Indian novelists
Year of birth missing (living people)
Living people